Jonas Howe (1786–1854) was a farmer and school teacher from Petersham, Massachusetts and member of the Massachusetts House of Representatives, serving in 1845.

Personal background and family relations
Jonas Howe was born in Petersham, Massachusetts on 15 July 1786 to Benjamin Howe (1759-1838) and Vashti (Holland) Howe (1761-1838). Howe married Arethusa Negus, daughter of Joel Negus and Betsy Gould, on 1 December 1816 at Petersham, and was a farmer and school teacher in the town.  In 1845 he was elected to a one-year term in the Massachusetts House of Representatives.  He had a second wife, Abigail (Bigelow) Brooks (1797-1883). Howe died at his home in Petersham on 8 January 1865.  Howe was a direct descendant of John Howe (1602-1680) who arrived in Massachusetts Bay Colony in 1630 from Brinklow, Warwickshire, England and settled in Sudbury, Massachusetts. Jonas Howe was also a descendant of Edmund Rice, an early immigrant to Massachusetts Bay Colony, as follows:

 Jonas Howe, son of
 Benjamin Howe (1759-1838), son of
 Mary Stow (1730-1794), daughter of
 Elizabeth Brigham (1700-1757), daughter of
 Nathan Brigham (1671-1747), son of
 Mary Rice (1646-1695), daughter of
 Henry Rice (1617-1711), son of
 Edmund Rice, (ca1594-1663)

References 

Members of the Massachusetts House of Representatives
1786 births
1865 deaths
People from Petersham, Massachusetts
Farmers from Massachusetts
19th-century American politicians